Cardiac glycosides are a class of organic compounds that increase the output force of the heart and decrease its rate of contractions by inhibiting the cellular sodium-potassium ATPase pump. Their beneficial medical uses are as treatments for congestive heart failure and cardiac arrhythmias; however, their relative toxicity prevents them from being widely used. Most commonly found as secondary metabolites in several plants such as foxglove plants, these compounds nevertheless have a diverse range of biochemical effects regarding cardiac cell function and have also been suggested for use in cancer treatment.

Classification

General structure 
The general structure of a cardiac glycoside consists of a steroid molecule attached to a sugar (glycoside) and an R group. The steroid nucleus consists of four fused rings to which other functional groups such as methyl, hydroxyl, and aldehyde groups can be attached to influence the overall molecule's biological activity. Cardiac glycosides also vary in the groups attached at either end of the steroid. Specifically, different sugar groups attached at the sugar end of the steroid can alter the molecule's solubility and kinetics; however, the lactone moiety at the R group end only serves a structural function.

In particular, the structure of the ring attached at the R end of the molecule allows it to be classified as either a cardenolide or bufadienolide. Cardenolides differ from bufadienolides due to the presence of an "enolide," a five-membered ring with a single double bond, at the lactone end. Bufadienolides, on the other hand, contain a "dienolide," a six-membered ring with two double bonds, at the lactone end. While compounds of both groups can be used to influence the cardiac output of the heart, cardenolides are more commonly used medicinally, primarily due to the widespread availability of the plants from which they are derived.

Classification 
Cardiac glycosides can be more specifically categorized based on the plant they are derived from, as in the following list. For example, cardenolides have been primarily derived from the foxglove plants Digitalis purpurea and Digitalis lanata, while bufadienolides have been derived from the venom of the cane toad Bufo marinus, from which they receive the "bufo" portion of their name. Below is a list of organisms from which cardiac glycosides can be derived.

Plant cardenolides 
 Convallaria majalis (Lily of the Valley): convallatoxin
 Antiaris toxicaria (upas tree): antiarin
 Strophanthus kombe (Strophanthus vine): ouabain (g-strophanthin) and other strophanthins
 Digitalis lanata and Digitalis purpurea (Woolly and purple foxglove): digoxin, digitoxin
 Nerium oleander (oleander tree): oleandrin
 Asclepias sp. (milkweed): oleandrin
 Adonis vernalis (Spring pheasant's eye): adonitoxin
 Kalanchoe daigremontiana and other Kalanchoe species: daigremontianin
 Erysimum cheiranthoides (wormseed wallflower) and other Erysimum species
 Cerbera manghas (suicide tree): cerberin

Other cardenolides 
 some species of Chrysolina beetles, including Chrysolina coerulans, have cardiac glycosides (including Xylose) in their defensive glands.

Bufadienolides 
 Leonurus cardiaca (motherwort): scillarenin
 Drimia maritima (squill): proscillaridine A
 Bufo marinus (cane toad): various bufadienolides – see also toad venom
 Kalanchoe daigremontiana and other Kalanchoe species: daigremontianin and others
Helleborus spp. (hellebore)

Mechanism of action 
Cardiac glycosides affect the sodium-potassium ATPase pump in cardiac muscle cells to alter their function. Normally, these sodium-potassium pumps move potassium ions in and sodium ions out. Cardiac glycosides, however, inhibit this pump by stabilizing it in the E2-P transition state, so that sodium cannot be extruded: intracellular sodium concentration therefore increases. With regard to potassium ion movement, because both cardiac glycosides and potassium compete for binding to the ATPase pump, changes in extracellular potassium concentration can potentially lead to altered drug efficacy. Nevertheless, by carefully controlling the dosage, such adverse effects can be avoided. Continuing on with the mechanism, raised intracellular sodium levels inhibit the function of a second membrane ion exchanger, NCX, which is responsible for pumping calcium ions out of the cell and sodium ions in at a ratio of /. Thus, calcium ions are also not extruded and will begin to build up inside the cell as well.

The disrupted calcium homeostasis and increased cytoplasmic calcium concentrations cause increased calcium uptake into the sarcoplasmic reticulum (SR) via the SERCA2 transporter. Raised calcium stores in the SR allow for greater calcium release on stimulation, so the myocyte can achieve faster and more powerful contraction by cross-bridge cycling. The refractory period of the AV node is increased, so cardiac glycosides also function to decrease heart rate. For example, the ingestion of digoxin leads to increased cardiac output and decreased heart rate without significant changes in blood pressure; this quality allows it to be widely used medicinally in the treatment of cardiac arrhythmias.

Non-cardiac uses 
Cardiac glycosides were identified as senolytics: they can selectively eliminate senescent cells which are more sensitive to the ATPase-inhibiting action due to cell membrane changes.

Clinical significance 
Cardiac glycosides have long served as the main medical treatment to congestive heart failure and cardiac arrhythmia, due to their effects of increasing the force of muscle contraction while reducing heart rate. Heart failure is characterized by an inability to pump enough blood to support the body, possibly due to a decrease in the volume of the blood or its contractile force. Treatments for the condition thus focus on lowering blood pressure, so that the heart does not have to exert as much force to pump the blood, or directly increasing the heart's contractile force, so that the heart can overcome the higher blood pressure. Cardiac glycosides, such as the commonly used digoxin and digitoxin, deal with the latter, due to their positive inotropic activity. On the other hand, cardiac arrhythmia are changes in heart rate, whether faster (tachycardia) or slower (bradycardia). Medicinal treatments for this condition work primarily to counteract tachycardia or atrial fibrillation by slowing down heart rate, as done by cardiac glycosides.

Nevertheless, due to questions of toxicity and dosage, cardiac glycosides have been replaced with synthetic drugs such as ACE inhibitors and beta blockers and are no longer used as the primary medical treatment for such conditions. Depending on the severity of the condition, though, they may still be used in conjunction with other treatments.

Toxicity 
From ancient times, humans have used cardiac-glycoside-containing plants and their crude extracts as arrow coatings, homicidal or suicidal aids, rat poisons, heart tonics, diuretics and emetics, primarily due to the toxic nature of these compounds. Thus, though cardiac glycosides have been used for their medicinal function, their toxicity must also be recognized. For example, in 2008 US poison centers reported 2,632 cases of digoxin toxicity, and 17 cases of digoxin-related deaths. Because cardiac glycosides affect the cardiovascular, neurologic, and gastrointestinal systems, these three systems can be used to determine the effects of toxicity. The effect of these compounds on the cardiovascular system presents a reason for concern, as they can directly affect the function of the heart through their inotropic and chronotropic effects. In terms of inotropic activity, excessive cardiac glycoside dosage results in cardiac contractions with greater force, as further calcium is released from the SR of cardiac muscle cells. Toxicity also results in changes to heart chronotropic activity, resulting in multiple kinds of dysrhythmia and potentially fatal ventricular tachycardia. These dysrhythmias are an effect of an influx of sodium and decrease of resting membrane potential threshold in cardiac muscle cells. When taken beyond a narrow dosage range specific to each particular cardiac glycoside, these compounds can rapidly become dangerous. In sum, they interfere with fundamental processes that regulate membrane potential. They are toxic to the heart, the brain, and the gut at doses that are not difficult to reach. In the heart, the most common negative effect is premature ventricular contraction.

References

External links 

 
Plant toxins